Akua Donkor (born 1952) is a Ghanaian politician, founder and leader of Ghana Freedom Party (GFP).

Early life
Donkor was born in February 1952, and hails from Afigya Kwabre District in the Ashanti Region of Ghana. She is a cocoa farmer by profession. She is not known to have had any formal education.

Politics
Madam Donkor was elected assembly woman for Herman, a step towards achieving her ambition of being the president of Ghana.  Her ambition to be president is evident in the 2012 polls where she applied to contest as an independent candidate. However she was barred by the electoral commission. Her party, Ghana Freedom Party has its headquarters situated in Kabu in the Eastern Region of Ghana. However this was gutted by fire on the 22, January 2016. This does not deter her ambition to become president. In her view, the start of a political party is a stepping stone to becoming a president. Currently Madam Donkor is in the process of opening regional offices for her party in all the ten regions of Ghana.

Campaign promise
When elected as president, Madam Donkor promises to make free education from primary to secondary level. She also seeks to raise import on taxes to enable people import more, also she would establish a free zone at the port of Tema to attract more businesses. This can all be achieved through the use of Ghana's resources such as Gold, cocoa, shea butter and salt.
Buying of the finished product of oil is just absurd especially when Ghana is an oil producing country and exports its oil in an unfinished form. Muammar Gaddafi, being her political icon, was of the view that Ghana should be able to rub shoulders with Libya in the production and sale of oil.

Madam Donkor appealed to Ghanaians to elect a woman as president since a woman has the capacity to transform the developmental process of this country.

Disqualification
On 10 October 2016, the Ghana Electoral Commission announced it has disqualified Akua Donkor together with 12 other presidential candidates from contesting in the 7 December 2016 election. She admitted that her nomination form was freight with errors as pointed out by the EC. She called on members and executives of the party not to lose hope as the party bounces back in 2020 to contest in the presidential race.

References

1952 births
Living people
People from Ashanti Region
Candidates for President of Ghana